Răsuceni is a commune located in Giurgiu County, Muntenia, Romania. It is composed of four villages: Carapancea, Cucuruzu, Răsuceni and Satu Nou.

References

Communes in Giurgiu County
Localities in Muntenia